L'Occitane en Provence,  "the Occitan woman (in Provence)," commonly known as L'Occitane, is a French luxury retailer of body, face, hair, fragrances, and home products based in Manosque, France. Founded in 1976 by Olivier Baussan, with the purpose to create a company that celebrates and preserves the traditions of his native Provence. In 2010, the company became listed on the Hong Kong Stock Exchange.

History
In 1976, 23-year-old Olivier Baussan used steam distillation to produce essential oil from wild rosemary and lavender which he sold at open-air markets in his native Provence. L'Occitane was named for the women of Occitania. This area existed during the Middle Ages, spanning southern France, north-eastern Spain and northern Italy. Occitan was the native language and is still spoken as a second language in some areas of this region.

In 1976, using an old soap factory that was donated to him, Olivier Baussan revived the traditional art of Marseille soap-making in Manosque, another Provençal village. He manufactured vegetable-based soaps. The first L'Occitane factory and boutique opened in 1981 in Volx, a village in Provence.

In the 1990s, Baussan sold a majority stake in the business to venture capitalists to finance expansion. As their approaches were incompatible, Baussan found himself excluded from daily management and strategic decision-making.

In 1994, Austrian businessman Reinold Geiger bought a 33% stake in the group. Through a series of capital increases, Geiger became majority shareholder in 1996. Geiger, as the new chairman, asked Baussan to return as creative director and lead product development. The company's new focus on marketing strategy paved the way for international expansion. In the late 1990s the company changed its name to 'L'Occitane en Provence', to strengthen the connection with the company's roots and because the term 'Provence' had more meaning to an international audience. On 20 April 2001, Clarins became a financial investor in the company through subscription to approximately 5.18% of the company's shares and €11,433,750 convertible debenture loan. On 22 February 2005, Clarins further invested €16,525,580 in convertible debentures. When the debentures were converted, Clarins held 23.33% of the shares. The management executed a leveraged buyout in May 2007 following which Reinold Geiger's stake rose from 31.9% to 48.7%, and Clarins' stake was diluted to 10.0%.

L'Occitane has shops in over 90 countries, in North America, South America, Europe, Asia, Australia and Africa; with 170 shops in the United States. At the launch of its IPO in 2010, the company announced that its products were sold in over 80 countries through over 1,500 retail locations; it had 753 L'Occitane Stores. In the year ended 31 March 2009, it generated sales of €537.3 million. It planned over 650 store openings with the capital raised.

In 2013, the company employed 6,600 people worldwide and created a new brand L'Occitane au Brésil, focused on products from Brazil.

In 2021, the company's US unit filed for Chapter 11 bankruptcy proceedings in New Jersey.

In 2021 L’Occitane Group acquired the US beauty brand Sol de Janeiro, valued in US$450 million.

In March 2022, L’Occitane acquired a majority stake in the Australian skincare brand, Grown Alchemist.

Following 2022 Russian invasion of Ukraine, L'Occitane announced it would continue to keep its Russian stores open on the grounds that it wanted to protect its staff from potential retaliation. Several days later L'Occitane reversed their decision announcing that it would be closing its Russian shops and website.  Nevertheless, Russian stores are still supplied with products, only as a separate legal entity with a new name (Л'Окситан).

Listing
In March 2010, the listing committee of the Hong Kong Stock Exchange approved its plan for a $400–$600 million initial public offering of L'Occitane International S.A., underwritten by CLSA, HSBC and UBS which the company had originally planned in 2008, but postponed because of the 2008 financial crisis. The company stated that two-thirds of the proceeds would be used to finance store openings. China Investment Corporation invested US$50 million in the company's IPO as the cornerstone investor (for approximately 1.9% of the shares). Following the listing of shares in L'Occitane International SA, L'Occitane Groupe SA retains 75% of the shareholding of the company; shares owned by Geiger, Clarins and other shareholders are indirect.

Beauty products

All of L'Occitane's products are developed and produced from its base in Manosque, where 1,000 employees work. The company sources the majority of its production from Provence and one of their main product l'Immortelle plants (Helichrysum italicum) from Corsica from producers who rely on traditional production methods.

L'Occitane contributes to preserve traditional cultivation methods by:
Supporting the program to cultivate almond trees in the Alps of Haute-Provence.
Preserving certain rare species through the planting of their own field of Immortelle flowers in Corsica.
Developing partnerships with organisations that support the development of scented and aromatic plants, such as the Office National Interprofessionel des Plantes à Parfum, and
Encouraging traditional cultivation, particularly that of lavender.

In addition to products sourced from Provence, shea butter is purchased directly from women's groups in Burkina Faso as Fair Trade with the ECOCERT certification. The shea tree is considered sacred, and its butter is known as "women's gold" because it is how the women make their money. Shea butter traditions are still used, such as only fallen fruit may be collected by women, and only women know the secret to making shea butter.

According to the company, it does not conduct animal testing, and no animal product or by-product, except for beehive products are used in the manufacturing process. L'Occitane develops most of its products and ingredients in line with the organic cosmetics specifications of the ECOCERT.

Melvita

L'Occitane bought Groupe M&A Development and its subsidiary, M&A Santé Beauté, which includes the organic cosmetic brand Melvita, in 2008. The company, which was founded in the Ardèche in 1983 by French biologist Bernard Chevilliat, commercialises ecological and organic cosmetics principally in France. In 1990, Melvita launched its first organic cosmetics range and its manufacturing obtained the ECOCERT certification. They now have stores in thirteen countries.

The L'Occitane Foundation 
La Fondation d'Entreprise L'Occitane is a private organisation founded in 2006 by the company, with a budget of 4 million euros for 6 years, to support visually impaired people and help the economic emancipation of women. It supports associations for the visually impaired particularly in Burkina Faso with NGOs that are specialised in training professionals to reduce blindness. The L'Occitane Foundation has formed a partnership with Orbis, an organisation that fights against avoidable blindness in developing countries. To support economic emancipation of women, the L'Occitane Foundation partnered with the association Faa-I-tuora to improve the way of living of people in Dissin, in the South West region of Burkina Faso.

In 2013, the United Nations Development Programme (UNDP) decided to recognise L'Occitane en Provence as an exemplary company within the framework of its 2013 "Growing Inclusive Markets" initiative. Since 2013, L'Occitane Foundation has rewarded  an ophthalmologist every two years for his work in the fight against blindness. In 2013 Professor Volker Klaus received the first l'Occitane Sight Award with a €50,000 grant for his action in Africa.

References

External links

 L'occitane Official website

Retail companies of France
French brands
Chemical companies established in 1976
Retail companies established in 1981
Cosmetics companies of France
Companies listed on the Hong Kong Stock Exchange
Companies based in Provence-Alpes-Côte d'Azur
Companies that filed for Chapter 11 bankruptcy in 2021